Robert True (born 5 November 1977) is a Liberian middle-distance runner. He competed in the men's 800 metres at the 2000 Summer Olympics.

References

External links
 

1977 births
Living people
Athletes (track and field) at the 2000 Summer Olympics
Liberian male middle-distance runners
Olympic athletes of Liberia
Place of birth missing (living people)